Charles Correll Jr. (January 23, 1944 – June 4, 2004) was an American television director and cinematographer. The son of Charles Correll Sr. of the sitcom Amos & Andy, his brother is Richard Correll, a former child actor and later a television director.

Death

He died of pancreatic cancer on June 4, 2004, in Los Angeles, California. He was survived by his wife Robin with two daughters and a son.

Filmography

Director

Actor

References

External links
 

1944 births
2004 deaths
American cinematographers
American television directors
People from Los Angeles
Deaths from pancreatic cancer
Deaths from cancer in California